The 1967 FIBA Intercontinental Cup was the 2nd edition of the FIBA Intercontinental Cup for men's basketball clubs. It took place at Varese, Naples & Rome. From the FIBA European Champions Cup participated Simmenthal Milano, Slavia VŠ Praha, and Ignis Varese. From the South American Club Championship participated Corinthians, and from the NABL participated the Akron Wingfoots.

Participants

Qualifying game
January 4, Naples

|}

Semi finals
January 5 & 6, Varese & Rome

|}

3rd place game
January 7, Rome

|}

Final
January 7, Palazzo dello Sport, Rome

|}

Final standings

External links
1967 Intercontinental Basketball Cup 

 

1966
1966–67 in American basketball
1966–67 in European basketball
1966–67 in South American basketball
International basketball competitions hosted by Italy
1967 in Italian sport